The 1955 Southwest Texas State Bobcats football team was an American football team that represented Southwest Texas State Teachers College—now known as Texas State University–as a member of the Lone Star Conference (LSC) during the 1955 college football season. Led by second-year head coach R. W. Parker, the Bobcats compiled an overall record of 6–1–2 and a mark of 5–1 in conference play, sharing the LSC title with Sam Houston State and East Texas State. The team's captain was Johnny Faseler.

Schedule

References

Southwest Texas State
Texas State Bobcats football seasons
Lone Star Conference football champion seasons
Southwest Texas State Bobcats football